Yavoriv urban territorial hromada is a hromada (municipality) in Ukraine, in Yavoriv Raion of Lviv Oblast. The administrative centre is the city of Yavoriv.

Settlements 
The hromada consists of one city (Yavoriv), two urban-type settlements (Krakovets and Nemyriv), and 79 villages:

 
 
 
 
 
 Velyki Makary
 
 
 
 
 
 
 
 
 Hlynets
 
 
 
 
 
 
 
 Zavadiv
 
 
 
 
 
 
 
 
 
 
 
 
 
 
 
 
 
 
 Nahachiv
 
 
 
 
 
 
 
 
 
 
 
 
 
 Rohizno
 
 
 
 
 
 
 
 
 
 
 
 
 
 
 
 
 Chernyliava

References 

2020 establishments in Ukraine
Hromadas of Lviv Oblast